Helmuth Otto Ludwig Weidling (2 November 1891 – 17 November 1955) was a German general during World War II. He was the last commander of the Berlin Defence Area during the Battle of Berlin, and led the defence of the city against Soviet forces, finally surrendering just before the end of World War II in Europe.

Military career
Born in Halberstadt in 1891, Weidling entered the military in 1911 and served as a lieutenant in the First World War. He remained in the reduced army of the Weimar Republic after the war. As an artillery officer, Weidling took part in the invasion of Poland, the Battle of France and during the early stages of Operation Barbarossa, the invasion of the Soviet Union. 

In January 1942, still on the Eastern Front, Weidling was appointed commander of the 86th Infantry Division.

Corps commander
On 15 October 1943, Weidling became the commander of the XLI Panzer Corps, a position he held until 10 April 1945 with a short break in his command from 19 June 1944 to 1 July 1944. During this break, Generalleutnant Edmund Hoffmeister took over during the first stages of Soviet Operation Bagration. Hoffmeister was in command when most of the German 9th Army, along with the XLI Panzer Corps, was encircled during the Bobruysk Offensive.

While Weidling was in command, XLI Panzer Corps was responsible for an atrocity committed by the Wehrmacht in the Soviet Union during the war: Up to 50,000 civilians were deliberately infected with typhus, and placed in a "typhus camp" in the area of Parichi, Belorussia, in the path of oncoming Red Army forces, in the hopes that this would cause a massive outbreak of typhus among the Red Army soldiers. This was noted by the commander of the 65th Soviet Army, General Pavel Batov, months later when it found itself facing this same corps in the Battle of Berlin.

The XLI Panzer Corps was rebuilt as part of the German 4th Army. The 4th Army, under the command of General Friedrich Hoßbach, was given the task of holding the borders of East Prussia. On 10 April 1945, Weidling was relieved of his command. He was thereafter appointed as commander of the LVI Panzer Corps.

The LVI Panzer Corps was part of Gotthard Heinrici's Army Group Vistula. As commander of this corps, Weidling began his involvement with the Battle of Berlin. 

On 16 April 1945, Weidling prepared to take part in the Battle of the Seelow Heights, which was part of the broader Battle of the Oder-Neisse. Weidling's LVI Panzer Corps was in the centre, flanked by the CI Army Corps to his left and the XI SS Panzer Corps to his right. All three corps were part of General Theodor Busse's 9th Army, which was defending the heights above the River Oder. While all three corps were in generally good defensive positions, they were conspicuously short of tanks. Weidling's commander, Heinrici, recognised the shortage earlier in the day, as Hitler had ordered the transfer of three panzer divisions from Army Group Vistula to the command of recently promoted Field Marshal Ferdinand Schörner. 

In the middle of the Battle of Berlin, the leader of the Hitler Youth, Artur Axmann, visited Weidling's headquarters and told him that the youngsters of the Hitler Youth were ready to fight and were even now manning the roads in the 56th rear. Weidling argued it was futile for these teenage boys to be thrown into the battle. He told Axmann it was, "the sacrifice of children for an already doomed cause". Axmann did not withdraw them from the battle.

By 19 April, with Schörner's Army Group Centre collapsing, Weidling's corps was forced to retreat west into Berlin. The German forces retreat from Seelow Heights during the 19th and 20th left no front line remaining.

Commander of the Berlin Defence Area
On 22 April, Hitler ordered that Weidling be executed by firing squad on receiving a report that he had retreated in the face of advancing Soviet Army forces, which was in defiance of standing orders to the contrary. Weidling had not actually retreated, and the sentence was called off after he appeared at the Führerbunker to clear up the misunderstanding.

On 23 April, Hitler appointed Weidling as the commander of the Berlin Defence Area. Weidling replaced Lieutenant General (Generalleutnant) Helmuth Reymann, Colonel (Oberst) Ernst Kaether, and Hitler himself. Reymann had held the position only since March.

The forces available to Weidling for the city's defence included roughly 45,000 soldiers in several severely depleted German Army and Waffen-SS divisions. These divisions were supplemented by the police force, boys in the compulsory Hitler Youth, and 40,000 men of the Volkssturm (militia). The commander of the central government district was SS-Brigadeführer Wilhelm Mohnke. Mohnke had been appointed to his position by Hitler and had over 2,000 men under his direct command. His core group were the 800 men of the Leibstandarte Adolf Hitler (LSSAH) SS battalion (assigned to guard Hitler). The Soviet command later estimated the number of defenders in Berlin at 180,000, but this was based on the number of German prisoners they captured. The prisoners included many unarmed men in uniform, such as railway officials and members of the Reich Labour Service (Reichsarbeitsdienst).

Weidling organised the defences into eight sectors designated "A" through to "H". Each sector was commanded by a colonel or a general, but most of the colonels and generals had no combat experience. To the west of the city was the 20th Panzergrenadier Division. To the north was the 9th Fallschirmjäger Division, to the north-east the Panzer Division Müncheberg. To the south-east of the city and to the east of Tempelhof Airport was the SS-Nordland Panzergrenadier Division composed mainly of foreign volunteers. Weidling's reserve, the 18th Panzergrenadier Division was in Berlin's central district.

Bendlerblock headquarters
Sometime around 26 April, Weidling chose as his base of operations the old army headquarters on the Bendlerstrasse, the "Bendlerblock." This location had well-equipped air-raid shelters and was close to the Reich Chancellery. In the depths of the Bendlerblock, Weidling's staff did not know whether it was day or night.

Around noon on 26 April, Weidling relieved Colonel Hans-Oscar Wöhlermann of command, and Major General Werner Mummert was reinstated as commander of the Müncheberg Panzer Division. Later that evening, Weidling presented Hitler with a detailed proposal for a breakout from Berlin. When Weidling finished, Hitler shook his head and said: "Your proposal is perfectly all right. But what is the point of it all? I have no intentions of wandering around in the woods. I am staying here and I will fall at the head of my troops. You, for your part, will carry on with your defence."

By the end of the day on 27 April, the encirclement of Berlin was completed. The Soviet Information Bureau announced that Soviet troops of the 1st Belorussian Front had broken through strong German defences around Berlin and, approaching from the east and from the south, had linked up in Berlin and northwest of Potsdam and that the troops of the 1st Belorussian Front took Gartenstadt, Siemenstadt and the Goerlitzer Railway Station in eastern Berlin. 

When Weidling discovered that a major part of the last line of the German defences in Berlin were manned by Hitler Youth, he ordered Artur Axmann to disband the Hitler Youth combat formations in the city. But, in the confusion, his order was never carried out.

Soviet advance
On 29 April, the Soviet Information Bureau announced that troops of the 1st Belorussian Front continued to clear the streets of Berlin, occupied the northwest sector of Charlottenburg as far as Bismarck Street, the west half of Moabit, and the eastern part of Schoeneberg. Soviet troops of the 1st Ukrainian Front occupied Friedenau and Grunewald in north and west Berlin.

During the evening of 29 April, Weidling's headquarters in the Bendlerblock was now within metres of the front line. Weidling discussed with his divisional commanders the possibility of breaking out to the southwest to link up with General Walther Wenck's 12th Army. Wenck's spearhead had reached the village of Ferch on the banks of the Schwielowsee near Potsdam. The breakout was planned to start the next night at 22:00.

On 30 April, the Soviet Information Bureau announced that Soviet troops of the 1st Belorussian Front had captured Moabit, Anhalter Railway Station, Joachimsthal to the north of Berlin, and Neukölln, Marienwerder and Liebenwalde. Troops of the 1st Ukrainian Front occupied the southern part of Wilmersdorf, Hohenzollerndamm and Halensee Railway Station.

The Führerbunker

Late in the morning of 30 April, with the Soviets less than 500 metres from the bunker, Hitler had a meeting with Weidling, who informed him that the Berlin garrison would probably run out of ammunition that night. Weidling asked Hitler for permission to break out, a request he had made unsuccessfully before. Hitler did not answer at first, and Weidling went back to his headquarters in the Bendlerblock, where at about 13:00, he received Hitler's permission to try a breakout that night.

After Hitler and Braun's suicides, Weidling reached the Führerbunker and was met by Joseph Goebbels, Reichsleiter Martin Bormann and General Hans Krebs. They took him to Hitler's room, where the couple had committed suicide. They told him that their bodies had been burned and buried in a shell crater in the Reich Chancellery garden above. Weidling was forced to swear that he would not repeat this news to anybody. The only person in the outside world who was to be informed was Joseph Stalin. An attempt would be made that night to arrange an armistice, and General Krebs would inform the Soviet commander so that he could inform the Kremlin.

Weidling rang Colonel Hans Refior, his civil Chief-of-Staff, in the Bendlerblock headquarters soon afterward. Weidling said that he could not tell him what had happened, but he needed various members of his staff to join him immediately, including Colonel Theodor von Dufving, his military Chief-of-Staff.

The meeting on 1 May between Krebs, who had been sent by Goebbels, and Soviet Lieutenant General Vasily Chuikov ended with no agreement. According to Hitler's personal secretary Traudl Junge, Krebs returned to the bunker complex looking "worn out, exhausted". The surrender of Berlin was thus delayed until Goebbels committed suicide, after which it was left up to Weidling to negotiate with the Soviets.

Surrender to Chuikov

On 2 May, Weidling had his Chief-of-Staff, Theodor von Dufving, arrange a meeting with Chuikov. Weidling told the Soviets about the suicides of Hitler and Goebbels, and Chuikov demanded complete capitulation.

Pursuant to Chuikov and Sokolovsky's direction, Weidling put his surrender order in writing. The document, written by Weidling, read as follows:

The meeting between Weidling and Chuikov ended at 8:23 am on 2 May 1945.

Post-war
The Soviet forces took Weidling into custody and flew him to the Soviet Union. Initially, he was held in the Butyrka and Lefortovo prisons in Moscow. On 27 February 1952, the Military Collegium of the Supreme Court of the Soviet Union sentenced him to 25 years' imprisonment for war crimes committed in the occupied Soviet Union. Weidling died on 17 November 1955 in the custody of the KGB in Vladimir of an apparent heart attack. He was buried in an unmarked grave at the prison cemetery. On 16 April 1996, the Chief Military Prosecutor's Office of the Russian Federation declared Weidling non-rehabilitative.

Awards
 German Cross in Gold on 23 June 1942 as Generalmajor and commander of 86. Infanterie Division
 Knight's Cross of the Iron Cross with Oak Leaves and Swords
 Knight's Cross on 15 January 1943 as Generalmajor and commander of 86. Infanterie Division
 Oak Leaves on 22 February 1944 as General der Artillerie commander of XLI. Panzerkorps
 Swords on 21 January 1945 as General der Artillerie and commander of XLI. Panzerkorps

References

Citations

Bibliography

External links 
 

1891 births
1955 deaths
People from Halberstadt
German Army generals of World War II
Generals of Artillery (Wehrmacht)
German Army personnel of World War I
German prisoners of war in World War II held by the Soviet Union
Recipients of the Gold German Cross
Recipients of the Knight's Cross of the Iron Cross with Oak Leaves and Swords
People from the Province of Saxony
German people who died in Soviet detention
Battle of Berlin
Military personnel from Saxony-Anhalt